Alasht (meaning Eagle Sanctuary, also Romanized as Ālāsht) is a city in the Central District of Savadkuh County, Mazandaran Province, Iran.  At the 2016 census, its population was 1,193.

Alasht is isolated by surrounding mountains, which gives it a cooler climate than most regions of the province. It is most known for being the birthplace of Reza Shah Pahlavi, the founder of the Pahlavi dynasty.

Natural resources
Alasht has a natural spring and is also noted for being one of the few cryotherapy spots of the province.

In addition, caves in and around Alasht are rich with minerals, mostly anthracite coal reserves.

Climate
Due to its location, Alasht is fairly cool throughout the year. Winter in the village is particularly harsh, causing most of the inhabitants to move to warmer areas for the season. However, the rainfall in the village is similar to the rest of the province, with approximately 593 millimeters of precipitation per year.

Gallery

References

Populated places in Savadkuh County
Cities in Mazandaran Province